Around the World with Willy Fog is a Spanish-Japanese animated television adaptation of the 1873 novel Around the World in Eighty Days by Jules Verne produced by Spanish studio BRB Internacional and Televisión Española, with animation by Japanese studio Nippon Animation, that was first broadcast on Antenne 2 in 1983 and TVE1 in 1984.

In the same vein as BRB's Dogtanian and the Three Muskehounds, the characters are anthropomorphisms of various animals as the species depicted are of much greater variety than in that series. The core trio are all felines being pursued by three canine foes. Willy Fog (Phileas Fogg in the original book) is depicted as a lion, while Rigodon (Passepartout) is a cat, and Romy (Aouda) is a panther.

An English dub of the series was directed by Tom Wyner, which featured artists such as Cam Clarke (as Rigodon), Gregory Snegoff (Inspector Dix), Steve Kramer (as Constable Bully) and Mike Reynolds. While the series never achieved popularity in the United States, the English version found fame when it was broadcast on Children's BBC in the United Kingdom. The series was initially screened in 1984 in the UK (and has been repeated many times since) and then on RTÉ in Ireland, while other dubs gained the series fanbases in several other countries. The series was also dubbed into Japanese and aired on Japan's TV Asahi in 1987, where it was titled .

With all of the international versions, the height of popularity remains in Spain, where a sequel series, Willy Fog 2, was produced in 1993 which has the characters in adaptations of Verne's science fiction novels, Journey to the Center of the Earth and 20,000 Leagues Under the Sea. Furthermore, in 2008, the series spawned a live-action theatrical musical show in celebration of its 25th anniversary.

Plot
As with every morning since he moved into Savile Row, Willy Fog awakens at 8:00 am and rings for his servant, only to remember that he fired him the previous day for his inability to follow Fog's precise schedule. He has already arranged an interview for a replacement – former circus performer Rigodon, who is even now rushing towards Fog's house to make his 11:00 am appointment. Rigodon is accompanied by his old circus colleague Tico, who hides within his travelling bag, and prompts him through the interview, which gets off to a bad start when Rigodon arrives four minutes late. Nonetheless, Rigodon is hired by Fog as his butler and soon departs for the Reform Club.

At the club, the main topic of conversation is the recent theft of £55,000 from the Bank of England which was discussed until the bank's governor Mr. Sullivan arrives and requests a change of topic. Sullivan's off-hand remark that the thief is still in London causes the elderly Lord Guinness to bring up an article in the Morning Chronicle, detailing how it is now possible to travel around the world in eighty days. The article states that one departs London by train for Dover, where one crosses to Calais, and on to Paris. From there, it is a train journey to Brindisi, and the Suez Canal, all within a week. Having rounded the Arabian peninsula, one would arrive in Bombay on day 20 and then a three-day railway journey to Calcutta. Hong Kong is reached on day 33, Yokohama on day 39, and then a mammoth three-week crossing of the Pacific to arrive in San Francisco on day 61, a week-long train crossing to New York City and then finally a nine-day crossing of the Atlantic back to London making it possible to circumnavigate the globe in eighty days. The other members of the club laugh at Lord Guinness's suggestion that he would take on the challenge if he were younger, prompting Fog to defend his honor by taking up the task himself. Sullivan bets Fog £5,000 that it is impossible, and additional wagers by three other club members increase this amount to £20,000. He then stuns the club by announcing that he will leave that very evening and promises to return to the club by 8:45 pm on 21 December 1872.

Rigodon is less than thrilled to hear the news of their impending trip, having spent his life travelling with the circus. However, he dutifully accompanies his master as they set out, with Tico still in hiding. Little do they know, however, that they are pursued by three individuals determined to halt their progress. Inspector Dix and Constable Bully of Scotland Yard are convinced that Fog is the thief who robbed the Bank of England, and the wicked and conniving Transfer, a saboteur, was hired by Mr. Sullivan to impede Fog's journey in any way.

Cast

Main characters

Supporting characters

Music

Spanish
Six songs were crafted for the series, composed by Italian background score writers Guido and Maurizio De Angelis and performed by the group Mocedades. The songs were synced with the movement of the animated characters. The eponymous theme song, "La Vuelta al Mundo de Willy Fog", was sung by Fog, Rigodon, Tico and Romy, while Rigodon and Tico also provided the ending theme, "Sílbame" ("Whistle to Me"). Extended versions of both the opening and closing theme tunes were regularly sung by the characters in-show in short musical numbers during the course of the series. As was the "Dix y Transfer" duet in addition two different melodies performed by the protagonists entitled "America America" and "Hay Que Viajar" ("It Is Necessary to Travel"). The sixth song, "Romy", was performed by the titular character, although it only featured in the series in an instrumental form. It would, however, later be used as the closing theme of the sequel series, "Willy Fog 2". The Spanish soundtrack was released in 1984 in LP album, CD and cassette formats. The soundtrack can also be downloaded in Spanish in MP3 format from Amazon's Spanish website.

English
The songs in the English dub of the series were sung by Ted Mather, re-using the De Angelis's music but with new English lyrics that are similar to the original Spanish. Perhaps most prominently, "Hay Que Viajar" was retitled "Daisy", and became a song about a woman by that name. All six songs were re-recorded in their entirety – even "Romy", which did not appear in the series. The English soundtrack is available to download in MP3 format from Amazon's UK website.

Japanese
Two new theme tunes were composed for the Japanese dub of the series, both sung by Keiko Han. The opening theme was entitled "Sky Way", while the closing tune was named "Our Two Watches".

Finnish
Songs in the Finnish dub were sung by the actors of YLE Import re-using the De Angelis's music but with new Finnish lyrics. In the Finnish dub some scenes are cut, which includes musical numbers in some episodes.

Czech
In Czech some scenes from Willy Fog episodes are cut (songs), but those "deleted scenes" are used in the opening and ending.

Staff

Spanish production
Produced by: BRB Internacional
With the collaboration of: Televisión Española
Music by: Guido & Maurizio De Angelis
Music publisher: Cabum Magister
Special thanks to: Iberia, the airline of Spain
Songs performed by: Mocedades
Directed by: Luis Ballester
Executive Producer: Claudio Biern Boyd
Original screenplay: Claudio Biern Boyd
Script Co-ordinator: Rafael Soler
Dialogue Adaptor and Voice Director: Manuel Peiro
Associate Productors: José Luis Rodríguez & José Manuel Iglesias
Audio mixed by: Oscar Gómez
Editor: Soledad López
Assistant Editor: Carmen Ortega
Special effects: Luis Castro
Production Assistant: Maria Aragón
Production Co-ordinator: Marisa Mato
Sound technicians: Eduardo Fernandez, Alfonso Pino, Jose Esquirol, José Maria, San Mateo
Recording studio: Exa, S.A.
Laboratory: Fotofilm Madrid, S.A.

Japanese production
Animation by: Nippon Animation
Director: Fumio Kurokawa
Producer: Koichi Motohashi
Character Design: Isamu Kumata
Storyboards: Eiji Okabe, Fumio Kurokawa, Hiromitsu Morita, Katsumi Endo, Ko Suzuki, Shigeo Koshi, Shigeru Omachi, Toru Hagiwara
Episode directors: Fumio Kurokawa, Eiji Okabe, Hiromitsu Morita, Toru Hagiwara, Yukio Okazaki
Animation directors: Hirokazu Ishino, Hisatoshi Motoki, Takao Kanishi, Yukio Abe
Music by: Shunsuke Kikuchi
Theme songs by: Izumi Kobayashi
Theme songs performed by: Keiko Han

English dub
Music Sub-publisher: Southern Pictures Music inc.
Recorded and re-mixed at: Intersound Inc., Hollywood, USA
English version directed and supervised by: Tom Wyner
English adaptations by: Tom Wyner, Byrd Ehlmann, Cynthia Lake, Ben Martin

Home media

The series distributed by BRB Internacional, was co-produced with Televisión Española, as a result, BRB Internacional must give approval before any home video release of the series is made available.

In December 1985, Sony Video Software announced the release of the series on VHS in the United States.

From 3 October 1988 to 4 June 1990, select episodes were released in the United Kingdom on PAL VHS tapes by Video Collection International (then: Lollipop Video), rated  U  for "Universal" and deemed suitable for all ages.

In 1995, BRB Internacional released three direct-to-video Willy Fog movies – Around the World in 80 Days, Journey to the Center of the Earth and 20,000 Leagues Under the Sea – each one created by heavily editing the first series from roughly 650 minutes in total down to a truncated 75 minutes apiece. All three films were dubbed by Village Productions, who had previously dubbed the second series for the United Kingdom, and later reached the United States on DVD. Notably, the Village Productions dub for the first movie was able to secure use of Intersound's English-language version of the theme tune.

In 2004, Revelation Films released all twenty-six episodes of Around the World with Willy Fog on DVD in the UK, across five Region-0-encoded discs. Extras included character profiles, a Jules Verne biography, and bonus episodes of Arthur! and the Square Knights of the Round Table and Dogtanian and the Three Muskehounds. In 2005, all five discs were collected in a complete series box set.

Around 2016, the English dub of all episodes of the series was uploaded to the official channel of BRB Internacional on the video-sharing website YouTube.

Willy Fog 2

Due to the success of the first series, BRB Internacional and Televisión Española revisited the franchise ten years later, with animation by Wang Film Productions in Taiwan and Shanghai Morning Sun Animation in China, released a sequel series simply titled Willy Fog 2. The series ran to 26 episodes, and consisted of two separate serialized stories that were based on the original novels Journey to the Center of the Earth and Twenty Thousand Leagues Under the Sea.

Around the World with Willy Fog: The Musical

La vuelta al mundo de Willy Fog: El Musical was released in 2008 in celebration of the show's 25th anniversary in its home country of Spain. With the original cartoon soundtrack by the De Angelises, the theatrical performance featured live actors Jaume Ortonobas (Fog), Laura Toledo (Romy) and José Troncoso (Rigodon) in make-up and masks to replicate the anthropomorphic characters of the cartoon. Tico is represented as a puppet manipulated by Celia Vioque. Scripted by original series creator Claudio Biern Boyd and directed by Ricard Reguant, the musical ran twice a day in the Teatro Häagen-Dazs Calderón in Madrid from October 2008; although originally intended only to run until the end of the year, the show's success saw its run extended first until early February 2009, after which it proved so successful that it went on tour around the country until the end of the year.

Feature film
By November 2020, a film based on the series was in development by Apolo Films and is scheduled to be released in 2023.

References

External links
BRB Internacional website

 
  Official Japanese at Nippon Animation
 

1983 anime television series debuts
Fiction set in 1872
Television series set in the 1870s
Television shows based on Around the World in Eighty Days
Historical anime and manga
Nippon Animation
Period television series
Shōnen manga
Fictional lions
RTVE shows
Spanish children's animated adventure television series
Steampunk anime and manga
1983 Spanish television series debuts
Animated television series about lions
Animated television series about cats
Fictional panthers
Television shows set in London
Television shows set in India
Television shows set in Mumbai
Television shows set in Kolkata
Cultural depictions of Indian women
Television shows set in the British Raj